Athanasius I (1230 – 28 October 1310) was the Ecumenical Patriarch of Constantinople for two terms, from 1289 to 1293 and 1303 to 1309. He was born in Adrianople and died in Constantinople. Chosen by the emperor Andronicus II Palaeologus as patriarch, he opposed the reunion of the Greek and Roman Churches and introduced an ecclesiastic reform that evoked opposition within the clergy. He resigned in 1293 and was restored in 1303 with popular support. The pro-Union clerical faction forced him into retirement in early 1310.

He is commemorated as a saint in the Orthodox Church with his feast day observed annually on 28 October.

References

Bibliography
 Afentoulidou-Leitgeb, Еirini, Die Hymnen des Theoktistos Studites auf Athanasios I. von Konstantinopel. Einleitung, Edition, Kommentar (Wien, Verlag der Österreichischen Akademie der Wissenschaften, 2008) (Wiener Byzantinische Studien, 27).
 Boojamra, John L. "Athanasios of Constantinople: A Study of Byzantine Reactions to Latin Religious Infiltration," Church History, 48 (1979), 27–48.
 Boojamra, John L. Church Reform in the late Byzantine Empire: A study of the patriarchate of Athanasius of Constantinople, 1289-1293, 1303-1309 (Brookline, MA, Hellenic College Press, 1980). 
 Boojamra, John L. The Church and Social Reform: The policies of the Patriarch Athanasios of Constantinople (New York, Fordham University Press, 1993)
 Mitsiou, Ekaterini, "Das Doppelkloster des Patriarchen Athanasios I. in Konstantinopel: Historisch-prosopographische und wirtschaftliche Beobachtungen," Jahrbuch der Österreichischen Byzantinistik, 58 (2008), 
 
 Talbot, Alice-Mary. "The Patriarch Athanasius (1289–1293; 1303–1309) and the Church," Dumbarton Oaks Papers, 27 (1973), 11–28.
 Talbot Alice-Mary M. (ed., tr. and comm.), The Correspondence of Athanasius I, Patriarch of Constantinople: Letters to the Emperor Andronicus II, members of the imperial family, and officials (Washington, Dumbarton Oaks Center for Byzantine Studies, 1975).
 Talbot, Alice-Mary M., Faith healing in late Byzantium: The posthumous miracles of the Patriarch Athanasios I of Constantinople by Theoktistos the Stoudite (Brookline, MA, Hellenic College Press, 1983) (Archbishop Iakovos library of ecclesiastical and historical sources, 8).

1230 births
1310 deaths
13th-century patriarchs of Constantinople
14th-century patriarchs of Constantinople
Byzantine saints of the Eastern Orthodox Church
People from Edirne